The Monterey County Weekly (sometimes called the "Weekly," formerly the Coast Weekly.) is a locally owned and independent newsmedia company founded in 1988.   As per the publication's name, it publishes in print weekly, and since 2020 online daily as Monterey County NOW. The company is based in the city of Seaside, in Monterey County, California.  The Weekly has been a member of the Association of Alternative Newsmedia since 1989.

History 
Monterey County Weekly was launched in 1988 by Bradley Zeve, its founding Editor & Publisher, and current CEO.  Zeve served as the Free Speech chair for the Association of Alternative Newsmedia (2004-2019), is the former president of the Sea Studios Foundation and co-founded The Sun newspaper in Santa Cruz, CA. Erik Cushman serves as Publisher and currently sits on the California Newspaper Publisher's Association Board of Directors. Cushman was the co-founder of the Missoula Independent.

The Weekly established the Monterey County Weekly Community Fund at the Community Foundation for Monterey County in 2000, and launched Monterey County Gives! in partnership with CFMC in 2009. The Monterey Peninsula Foundation became a key partner in 2018, To date, the fund has raised and donated over $55 million to 600+ local nonprofits, in partnership with the Community Foundation, the Monterey Peninsula Foundation, Neumeier Poma Investment Council, Cannery Row Company, the David and Lucile Packard Foundation and the Posey Family Foundation. The annual campaign runs from mid-November to midnight December 31. 

The Weekly currently reaches one in three households in Monterey County (audited by Verified Audit Circulation) in print, making it the most widely read publication in Monterey County. The Weekly began uploading its entire contents online beginning in 1996, the first media online in the county. 

Monterey County NOW, a daily e-newsletter to residents of the community was established in 2020, and reaches nearly 50,000 households. In March of 2020, the Weekly’s website had over 1 million pageviews.

Most recent readership audit Print Publication: Average Net Circulation: 33,583 (Print Edition)
e-Edition only of Newspaper: Average Monthly Unique Users: 4,303 (Digital Edition)
Website: Average Website Unique Users per week: 143,555
Social Media: Average Facebook Likes: 14,266
Average Twitter Followers: 8,406
E‐Newsletters: Average E‐Newsletter Subscribers: 36,086

Recipient of the First Amendment Coalition Free Speech & Open Government Award (2015) and Association of Alternative Newsmedia Free Speech Award (2016).

The mission of Monterey County Weekly is to inspire independent thinking and conscious action, etc.

Outstanding achievements 
While its reporting is almost entirely local, Monterey County Weekly was the only newspaper in the alternative press to send a reporter to the middle east to cover both the Desert Storm war in the early 1990s and the Iraq war in early 2003
.

The Weekly was an early adapter to digital news and began publishing online, as well as in print, in 1996. The company is powered by 165 solar panels on its rooftop and generates 100% of its electricity from solar.  The Weekly is also headquartered in the first commercial office building designed by one of the innovators of postmodernism Charles Moore (architect) who received the AIA Gold Medal in 1991. The Weekly Building, in Seaside, California, is certified by the US Green Building Council as LEED Platinum: Existing Building in 2009, the first existing building in the tri-county area to obtain that designation, and the first newspaper in the USA to generate 100% of its electricity by the sun.  

The paper has won over 100 local, regional, state or national editorial awards for editorial content, design and photography. Monterey County Weekly was awarded General Excellence for large circulation weekly newspapers by the California Newspaper Publishers Association (2012, runner-up 2013)  and the 2015 Free Speech & Open Government award from the First Amendment Coalition.

References

External links
 Official Website

Companies based in Monterey County, California
Mass media in Monterey County, California
Independent newspapers published in the United States